The Dalia Oil Field is an oil field in deepwater block 17,   off the coast of Cabinda, Angola. Dalia oil field was discovered in September 1997 and brought into production in December 2006.

Operator
Sonangol is the Block 17 concessionaire. Like other developments in the Block 17, the operator is Total S.A. with interest of 40%, and other partners are Statoil of Norway (23.33%), ExxonMobil of the United States (20%) and BP of the United Kingdom (16.67%).

Facility
On top of this is 29,400 tonnes of processing facilities which was mainly built and installed at DSME in South Korea. There will be a total installed power capacity of 66 MW. Th living quarters will hold up to 120 people and can be increased to 190 during shutdowns. The structure has a design working life of 20 years.
The Dalia subsea production system has 350 wells, consisting of 34 production wells and 30 water injection wells and 3 gas injection wells.

The wells are highly deviated, i.e. they are almost horizontal in the reservoirs. One major aspect of the well programme is the large-scale use of horizontal Christmas trees designed to allow wells to be drilled through them
These are being drilled with two rigs, Pride Africa and Pride Angola, in tandem for the initial 18 months of the campaign of which will require some 2,500 days in all.

Reservoir
The Dalia field has three main reservoirs and the adjacent Camelia reservoir. These reservoirs were formed more than 25 million years ago by the accumulation of sediment at the mouth of the Congo River. Today, they lie not very far (about ) below the seabed, forming reservoirs that contain a viscous (between 21° and 23° API) oil at relatively low temperatures of between 45 °C and 50 °C. Associated gas will not be flared but reinjected, thus contributing to maintaining the pressure of the field.

The start-up of Dalia coincided with Angola's entry into the Organization of Petroleum Exporting Countries (OPEC).

References

Oil fields of Angola